Ananta Tripathi Sarma was an Indian politician. He was elected to the Lok Sabha, the lower house of the Parliament of India as a member of the Indian National Congress.

References

External links
Official biographical sketch in Parliament of India website

1905 births
Date of death unknown
Lok Sabha members from Odisha
India MPs 1962–1967
India MPs 1967–1970
Indian National Congress politicians from Odisha
India MPs 1957–1962